Pedras Altas (Portuguese meaning "High Rocks") is a Brazilian municipality in the southern part of the state of Rio Grande do Sul. The population is 1,954 (2020 est.) in an area of 1377.37 km2. The Jaguarão River, which forms the border with Uruguay here, flows along the southwestern part of the municipality.

Bounding municipalities

Aceguá
Candiota
Herval
Pinheiro Machado

References

External links
 Official website 
http://www.citybrazil.com.br/rs/pedrasaltas/ 

Municipalities in Rio Grande do Sul